Lagos State University of Science and Technology is a government-owned tertiary institution located in Ikorodu, Lagos State, Nigeria. The institution was formerly known as Lagos State College of Science and Technology (LACOSTECH) and later changed to Lagos State Polytechnic (LASPOTECH).

History

The Lagos State university of Science and Technology ( formerly known as Lagos State Polytechnic) was established with the promulgation of Lagos State Edict No. 1 of 1978 with retroactive effect from June 1, 1977. The Institution commenced classes in January, 1978 at a temporary site (now the Isolo Campus) with five Departments namely, Accountancy, Business administration, Banking and finance, Marketing and Insurance.

On 1 August 1978, the School of Agriculture in Ikorodu was merged with the Institution and it became the nucleus of the present–day permanent site at Ikorodu. In 1988. In 1986, the Lagos State Government changed the name of the Institution from Lagos State College of Science and technology, (LACOSTECH) to Lagos State Polytechnic (LASPOTECH). In 2021, the institution was converted into a university by Governor Babajide Sanwo-Olu.

In the late 1970s, the Lagos State Government acquired 400 hectares of land at Ikosi village adjacent to the Lagos-Ibadan Expressway, which was proposed for development as the permanent site of the Institution. However, with the encroachment on the Ikosi land, its development into the permanent site was no longer  visible. The State Government decided in favor of Ikorodu as the permanent site of the Institution in 1985. As a result of this change, the administrative head office of the  polytechnic hitherto located at Isolo Campus since inception of Institution moved  to the permanent site at Ikorodu in May 2000.

The Polytechnic currently has staff strength of 808 with 56 accredited programmes across the various schools.

The Polytechnic runs a portal (EDUPORTAL) on its website – www.mylaspotech.edu.ng. The portal is currently used to process admission and registration of full-time students and students of School of Part-Time Studies. Plans are on to make the portal more robust to enable checking of examination results, issuance of letters of completion and transcripts, e-learning, access to an e-library, dissemination of campus information and incredible development of Information and Communication Technology.

The Institution, which began lectures with 287 pioneer students, currently has about 50,000 full-time and part-time students. The Polytechnic presently operates on three campuses namely Isolo, Surulere and Ikorodu. The latter serves as the permanent site of the Institution, Ikosi Campus having extinct.

Notable alumni
 
 
Yinka Durosinmi
Adekunle Gold
Iyabo Ojo
Seun Bamiro
David Lanre Messan

Architectures and monuments

See also
List of universities in Nigeria

References

 NAN (May 7, 2018) NIPOGA 2017: LASPOTECH clinches top position with 16 gold The News (Nigeria)
 AJASA INFO (NOVEMBER 23, 2020)
 LASG Appoints New Rector For The Lagos State Polytechnic AJASA INFO (Nigeria)

External links

 https://www.premiumtimesng.com/news/top-news/503312-exclusive-sanwo-olu-to-sign-new-universities-laws-in-january-official.html

Technological universities in Nigeria
Education in Lagos State
Public universities in Nigeria